Indothele lanka, is a species of spider of the genus Indothele. It is endemic to Sri Lanka.

References

Mygalomorphae
Endemic fauna of Sri Lanka
Spiders of Asia
Spiders described in 1995